Prof. Ved Prakash Nanda is an American academic who received Padma Bhushan award on 20 March 2018 in the field of Literature and Education.

References

American people of Indian descent
Recipients of the Padma Bhushan in literature & education
Living people
Recipients of the Padma Bhushan
Year of birth missing (living people)